Hibernian Magazine may refer to the following periodicals:
 Walker's Hibernian Magazine (1771–1812; called The Hibernian Magazine until 1786)
 Duffy's Hibernian Magazine (1864–1866)
 The Hibernia Magazine (1937–1980)
 The Hibernian (2006–2008)

See also
 Hibernian (disambiguation)